GNC may refer to:

Politics 
 General National Congress, the former legislative authority of Libya
 Green National Committee, the governing body of the Green Party of the United States
 Green National Convention, of the Green Party of the United States
 Générations NC, political party in New Caledonia

Schools
 Guagua National Colleges, in Pampanga, Philippines
 Guru Nanak College (disambiguation)

Other uses 
 GNC (store), for "General Nutrition Centers", an American fitness and nutrition supplements retail chain
 GNC hypothesis, on the origin of genes
 
 Gandhinagar Capital railway station, in Gujarat, India
 Gender nonconformity, an individual's behavior that does not match gender norms
 Geographical Names Committee, a Chinese organization adopting SASM/GNC romanization
 Gibraltar Nynex Communications, a former telecommunications operator in Gibraltar
 Global Night Commute, a 2006 protest event
 Good Neighbour Council, a post-World War II program of the Government of Australia
 Greencore, an Irish food company
 Guanche language
 Guidance, navigation, and control, in aeronautics
 A cocaine hapten analog